Uncial 0133 (in the Gregory-Aland numbering), ε 83 (Soden), is a Greek uncial manuscript of the New Testament, dated paleographically to the 9th century. Formerly it was labelled by Wg.

Description 

The codex contains a parts of the Matthew 1:1-14; 5:3-19; 23:9-25:30; 25:43-26:26; 26:50-27:16; Mark 1:1-43; 2:21-5:1; 5:29-6:22; 10:51-11:13, on 29 parchment leaves (33 cm by 26 cm). The text is written in two columns per page, 20 lines per page, in large uncial letters.

It is very hard to read.

It is a palimpsest, the upper text is a menaeon (see Uncial 094, Uncial 0120). Formerly to this codex were included Uncial 0271, 0272 and 0273 (because of similarities).

The Greek text of this codex is a representative of the Byzantine text-type. Aland placed it in Category V.

In Matthew 5:11 οι ανθρωποι along with g1, q, vgs, syrs,c; it has also additional ρημα (as C, W, Θ, 0196).

In Matthew 26:7 – βαρυτιμου along with B, W, 089, 0255, f1, f13, Byz; the other manuscripts read πολυτιμου (Sinaiticus, Alexandrinus, Bezae, Regius, Koridethi, 33, 565, 892, 1010 1424).

History 

Currently it is dated by the INTF to the 9th century.

The text of menaion was written by Archbishop of Selymeria in 1431. The manuscript was discovered in 1881 by Abbott and Mahaffy in Blenheim Palace. Gregory in 1883 found two leaves more.

Puttick bought it in 1882 for the British Museum.

The codex is located now at the British Library (Add MS 31919) in London.

See also 

 List of New Testament uncials
 Textual criticism
 Uncial 0269

References

Further reading 

 T.K. Abbott, On An Uncial Palimpsest Evangelistarium, Hermathena V (Dublin, 1885), p. 146-150. 
 J. P. Mahaffy, An uncial MS of the Gospels, Athenaeum (London, 2 July 1881). 
 Hermann von Soden, "Die Schriften des Neuen Testaments, in ihrer ältesten erreichbaren Textgestalt hergestellt auf Grund ihrer Textgeschichte," Verlag von Arthur Glaue, Berlin 1902, pp. 79–80.

Palimpsests
Greek New Testament uncials
9th-century biblical manuscripts
British Library additional manuscripts